Moin Uddin Ahmed, known as 'Montu', was a physician and politician. He was elected a Member of Parliament from Undivided Rajshahi-1 in 1973 and from Chapai Nawabganj-1 in 1986. He was the organizer of the Liberation War of Bangladesh.

Early life 
Moin Uddin Ahmed was born on 1 November 1936 in Shibganj Upazila of Chapai Nawabganj District. His father is Kalim Uddin Ahmed and mother Begum Del Afroz.

Career 
Moin Uddin Ahmed was a physician. He was the organizer of the Liberation War of Bangladesh. He is the former president of Chapainawabganj district Awami League. He was elected to parliament from Undivided Rajshahi-1 a Bangladesh Awami League candidate in 1973 Bangladeshi general election. He was elected a member of parliament from Chapai Nawabganj-1 an Independent candidate in 1986 Bangladeshi general election.

Death 
Moin Uddin Ahmed died on 2 September 2011.

References 

1936 births
2011 deaths
People from Chapai Nawabganj district
Awami League politicians
1st Jatiya Sangsad members
3rd Jatiya Sangsad members
Bangladeshi physicians